Jed Lamb (born 19 October 1992) is a former Australian rules footballer who played for the Sydney Swans, Greater Western Sydney Giants and Carlton Football Club in the Australian Football League (AFL).

Early life

One of eight children, Lamb was six years old when his father was murdered by a family friend.

AFL career
He was recruited from the Gippsland Power in the TAC Cup with the 21st selection in the 2010 AFL Draft and played with the Sydney Swans from 2011 to 2013. However at the end of 2013 season he left the Swans to play for cross town rivals the Giants in a bid to get regular games.

In October 2015, Lamb and other Giants' teammates of Andrew Phillips, Lachie Plowman and Liam Sumner were traded to Carlton.

Lamb made his debut for the Blues' in round 1, 2016. He kicked a goal with his first kick in a Blues' jumper. 

He was delisted at the end of the 2018 season.

References

External links

Living people
1992 births
Greater Western Sydney Giants players
Sydney Swans players
Gippsland Power players
Australian rules footballers from Victoria (Australia)
Carlton Football Club players
Preston Football Club (VFA) players